Edward Summer (March 18, 1946 – November 13, 2014) was an American painter, motion picture director, screenwriter, internet publisher, magazine editor, journalist and science writer, comic book writer, novelist, book designer, actor, cinematographer, motion picture editor, documentary filmmaker, film festival founder, and educator. He died on November 13, 2014.

Among his better known works are the collection of Carl Barks stories Uncle Scrooge McDuck: His Life and Times, the Dinosaur Interplanetary Gazette (one of the pioneering online magazines), the first motion picture based upon Robert E. Howard's character Conan the Barbarian, the novel Teefr, and a prequel The Legend of Teddy Bear Bob.

Early work 
Born in Buffalo, New York, Summer studied painting at the Albright Art Gallery (now called the Albright-Knox Art Gallery, Albright Art School, and with the noted water-color painter Sandra Chessman. He was also acquainted from childhood with another noted water-colorist, Robert Blair.

Charles Summer, his father, was an amateur photographer who owned a then uncommon Exakta single lens reflex camera. The photographer Milton Rogovin was a family friend and early on exposed him to fine-art photographs.

At age 15, Summer had a special one-man exhibit of his drawings in a group show at the Buffalo Museum of Science.

Theater 
At the Studio Theater (now called Studio Arena Theater), Buffalo, New York, Summer appeared in Many Moons, based on a James Thurber book, choreographed by Michael Bennett, and directed by Roberta Sharpe circa 1961.

He also worked with Fred Keller and Neal Du Brock as actor and stage manager, as well as Joe Krysiak founder of Project Artaud.

Motion pictures 
Encouraged by experimental filmmaker Peter Adair, Summer ultimately attended the first year of the New York University School of the Arts (then under the NYU School of Education and called the School of Television, Motion Pictures and Radio). Haig Manoogian, instrumental in starting the career of Martin Scorsese by producing the film Who's That Knocking at My Door headed the school and was one of the main instructors.

At NYU, Summer continued painting and studied with, among others, acclaimed photo-realist Audrey Flack. Harry Hurwitz, director of The Projectionist was also an instructor and personal friend.

His student film Item 72-D, The Adventures of Spa and Fon not only won multiple awards, but was shown worldwide at many film festivals. It was the first film shown at the Film Forum movie theater in New York City when the Film Forum was only a tiny loft space on West 88th Street in Manhattan. Hervé Villechaize, then unknown, was one of the stars of Item 72-D, The Adventures of Spa and Fon. Villechaize went on to fame in The Man with the Golden Gun and as a recurring character on the television series Fantasy Island. A co-writer of the film, John Byrum went on to write and direct numerous other films. Both Manoogian and Scorsese were advisors to the project.

Other early films included:
 Solstice (1968) - film editor
 High on the Wind Rivers (1970) - cinematographer, film editor
 Street Scenes (1970) - cinematographer, sound recording, film editor

As a fellow of the National Endowment for the Arts, Summer received a grant to produce a documentary about the history of American comic strip and comic book art. This unfinished film covered, among other people, Jack Kirby, Milton Caniff, Carl Barks, Chuck Jones, Ray Bradbury, Dick Huemer and Ralph Bakshi.

He worked with CBS's Camera Three on a two-part series covering the history of comic books and comic strips.

In 1975, Summer helped his friend Brian De Palma redo all of the promotional materials for Phantom of the Paradise. As a result, producer Edward R. Pressman approached Summer for other projects. The result was Conan the Barbarian which took nearly seven years to bring to the screen. The original treatment/screenplay was written by Summer with some collaboration by Roy Thomas who had written and edited the Marvel Comic Book series.

In 2003, he founded the Buffalo International Film Festival. Summer has been executive director since 2005.

Comic books 
Gold Key Comics Several science fiction adaptations for Starstream. Born of the Sun. Shaka

Marvel Comics Plot Red Sonja Issue One. Red Sonya and the Unicorn. This story largely defined Red Sonja's personality and "inner nature".

Plot: The Invaders Involving the revival of the Golem to defeat the Axis.

Plot: Conan the Barbarian The Devourer of the Dead story about origin of Egyptian pyramids.

Editor: Superman the Movie Magazine, DC Comics

Summer was instrumental in beginning the process that resulted in Jerry Siegel and Joe Shuster receiving lifetime financial benefits from their creation of Superman.

Magazines 
Founding editor and co-publisher: The Dinosaur Times.

Contributing writer: Written By, Time, The New York Times, Circus, Films in Review, The Perfect Vision, The Absolute Sound, Home Theater Magazine, Skeptical Inquirer, Skeptical Briefs, The Monster Times.

Digital Nitrate Prize 
In 2005, Edward Summer founded The Digital Nitrate Prize in order to encourage the research necessary to properly transfer and preserve the world's motion picture heritage using the developing digital media. Based upon the X Prize, the Digital Nitrate Prize will offer a cash prize for the first individual, group or corporation which is able to exactly duplicate the look of nitrate film stock using digital transfer and digital projection.

Constructive Living 
Edward Summer was a certified instructor of Constructive Living. He studied with David K. Reynolds in Los Angeles, New York, West Virginia and Tennessee.

Trivia 
 Summer has taught animation history at School of Visual Arts New York City.
 Summer's contributions to Star Wars and friendship with George Lucas was profiled extensively in 2013 through interviews with Jonathan Rinzler in issues 139, 140, 141 of the magazine Star Wars Insider.

Filmography 
 1968 - Solstice - producer, editor
 1968 - DeFeet - producer, director, cinematographer
 1970 - Item 72-D: The Adventures of Spa and Fon - producer, director
 1970 - Street Scenes - director/cameraman, editor
 1970 - High in the Wind Rivers - director/cameraman
 1980 - Starship Under - director, screenwriter - (never finished)
 1982 - Conan the Barbarian - associate producer
 1983 - Star Wars - marketing consultant
 1989 - Little Nemo: Adventures in Slumberland - screenplay
 2005 - Silent Music - producer, director (in production)
 2005 - The Magic of Magic - producer, director (in production)
 2006 - Clicker Clatter - producer
 2007 - Sirens - producer 
 2007 - Calvin of Oakknoll - executive producer, consulting director (in production)

References

External links 
 
 Partial Comics Bibliography
 The Dinosaur Interplanetary Gazette
 The Buffalo International Film Festival
 Summer Stuff Blog
 The Digital Nitrate Prize Website
  Article: Richard Williams: The Animator Who Never Gave Up
 Library of Congress: Orphan Works Legislation Advocacy
 Articles in New York Daily News

1946 births
2014 deaths
American comics writers
American male screenwriters
American film directors
American film producers
American magazine editors
American online publication editors
Tisch School of the Arts alumni
Artists from Buffalo, New York
Writers from Buffalo, New York
American male non-fiction writers
Screenwriters from New York (state)
American film editors